The Devil You Know is the 12th studio album from L.A. Guns. The album was produced by Tracii Guns and released by Frontiers Records on March 29, 2019.

Background
Tracii Guns stated that after the success of the previous album The Missing Peace they decided to continue with the same metal sound, saying that he drew influence from the New Wave of British Heavy Metal, while also sticking to the band's roots and influences from the 1960s and 1970s. Although Ace Von Johnson is credited on rhythm guitar, he does not play on the album. Tracii Guns plays all the electric guitars on this album.

Chart performance
"The Devil You Know" reached No. 38 on the Billboard Current Album Sales Chart, No. 45 on the Billboard Album Sales Chart, and No. 10 on the Billboard Independent Album Sales Chart. Neither of the two singles, "Rage" and "Stay Away", released from the album charted.

Track listing

Personnel
Phil Lewis – lead vocals
Tracii Guns – all guitars, backing vocals
Johnny Martin – bass, backing vocals
Shane Fitzgibbon – drums
Ace Von Johnson – rhythm guitar, backing vocals (credited but doesn’t play on the album)

Charts

References 

2019 albums
L.A. Guns albums
Frontiers Records albums